Arson for Hire is a 1959 crime drama film directed by Thor L. Brooks. The film stars Steve Brodie, Lyn Thomas and Tom Hubbard, who also wrote.
Arson squad investigator Johnny Broderick and his partner Ben Howard, investigate a warehouse fire, and find evidence of arson.

Premise
Actress Keely Harris inherits a warehouse from her father that is burned in a fire. Her father's business partner informs her that he and her father had planned the fire and demands half the insurance money. Meanwhile, arson investigator Johnny Broderick and assistant Ben Howard suspect the fire wasn't an accident.

Cast
 Steve Brodie	...	Arson Squad Insp. John 'Johnny' Broderick
 Lyn Thomas	...	Keely Harris
 Tom Hubbard      ...	Ben Howard, Broderick's Assistant
 Jason Johnson	        ...	William Yarbo
 Frank J. Scannell		...	Pop Bergen (as Frank Scanell)
 Wendy Wilde		...	Marilyn 'Marilee' Bergen
 John Frederick		...	Clete, the Photographer (as John Merrick)
 Corinne Cole		...	Cindy, the Secretary (as Lari Laine)
 Antony Carbone		...	Foxy Gilbert
 Lyn Osborn	...	Jim, the Fireman
 Robert Riordan		...	Fire Chief Boswell
 Walter Reed		...	Chief Hollister
 Reed Howes		...	Barney, the Bartender
 Lester Dorr		...	Cab Dispatcher
 Frank Richards		...	Man Making Phone Calls

Release
The film was released as a double feature with The Giant Behemoth.
According to tvguide.com, the film is a, "Crummy actioner [that's] pretty horrendous when the stock footage of fires isn't onscreen."

Tabonga
The "Tabonga" suit from the film From Hell It Came appears in a warehouse. The characters even have a gunfight in front of it. Apparently, the warehouse used in the scene was Allied Artists Pictures own. The scene can be viewed on YouTube.

References

External links
 
 

Film noir
1959 crime drama films
1959 films
American crime drama films
American black-and-white films
1950s English-language films
Films directed by Thor L. Brooks
1950s American films